Rajiv Sharma  (born 10 June 1984) is a New Zealand-born cricketer and former captain of the Oxford University cricket team. Both a right-handed batsman and right-arm medium-fast bowler, Sharma attended Auckland Grammar School before Oxford, and also played for the Auckland A team.

References
 
 

Oxford University cricketers
1984 births
Living people
New Zealand cricketers
People educated at Auckland Grammar School
Alumni of Mansfield College, Oxford
Oxford MCCU cricketers